Bolna may refer to:

Places
Bolna, Rana, a mountain in the municipality of Rana, Norway
Bolna Station, a station on the Nordland Line in Rana, Norway

Music
Bolna (song), a duet song, sung by Arijit Singh and Asees Kaur
Waqt Par Bolna, an album by Hariharan